The 2009 Sultan Azlan Shah Cup was the 18th edition of the Sultan Azlan Shah Cup. It was held in Ipoh, Malaysia from 5 to 12 April 2009.

India won the tournament for the fourth time by defeating the hosts Malaysia 3–1 in the final.

Teams
Five countries participated in the tournament:

Results
All times are local, MYT (UTC+8).

Pool

Classification round

Third and fourth place

Final

Statistics

Final standings

Goalscorers

References

External links
Official website

Sultan Azlan Shah Cup
2009 in field hockey
2009 in Malaysian sport
2009 in New Zealand sport
2009 in Egyptian sport
2009 in Pakistani sport 
2009 in Indian sport 
April 2009 sports events in Asia